Pardon Ndhlovu (pronounced end-low-voo, born August 23, 1987) is a marathon runner from Zimbabwe. He competed at the 2016 Summer Olympics and placed 41st. Ndhlovu was a four-time all-American cross country and track & field performer at UNC Pembroke where he earned his bachelor's degree in 2013.

Ndhlovu earned his MBA degree in December 2015 at Augusta University and worked there as an assistant coach. He is an ambassador for a social enterprise that distributes clean water worldwide. He is also vice president of SEFAYE (Sports and Education for African Youth Empowerment).

References

1987 births
Living people
Zimbabwean male long-distance runners
Zimbabwean male marathon runners
Olympic athletes of Zimbabwe
Athletes (track and field) at the 2016 Summer Olympics